Thomas Høie (28 April 1883 – 30 August 1948) was a Norwegian rower who competed for Christiania Roklub. He competed in coxed eights  at the 1912 Summer Olympics in Stockholm. He was an educated engineer and married Louise Wilhelmine Collett Høie (16 May 1981 – 27 February 1991) in 1918.

References

External links

 

1883 births
1948 deaths
Sportspeople from Gjøvik
Norwegian male rowers
Rowers at the 1912 Summer Olympics
Olympic rowers of Norway